Michael John Cudahy  (March 24, 1924 – March 11, 2022) was an American entrepreneur, business executive, and philanthropist.

Early life, family and education

Born in Milwaukee, Wisconsin, in 1924, Cudahy was the son of John Cudahy, United States ambassador to Ireland, Poland and Belgium.  His grandfather was Patrick Cudahy, founder of the Patrick Cudahy Meat Company.

On August 2, 2007, WTMJ-AM in Milwaukee reported that Michael Cudahy was one of several private investors considering purchasing Midwest Airlines.

Career
Along with Warren Cozzens, Cudahy founded Marquette Electronics in 1965 and served as chairman and CEO. The company went public in 1991.  After starting with only $15,000 in capital, the company went on to have over $350 million annually in sales. This company created the nation's first central electrocardiographic system at Northwestern University Medical School. The machine became standard in hospitals throughout the United States.  The company was also noted for having one of the first on-site daycare centers in the nation.  

In 1982, he and Warren bought the failing Patient Monitoring Business Unit from GE (then known as General Electric Medical Systems Division) and combined it with the existing business (primarily diagnostic equipment). By 1998, however, he sold Marquette Electronics (by then known as Marquette Medical Systems) to GE. The company exists today as part of the Clinical Systems division of GE Healthcare, a subsidiary of the American conglomerate. After stepping aside at his company, Cudahy focused his energies on philanthropy and serving on the boards of other companies.  

In 1999, according to U.S. Securities and Exchange Commission (SEC) filings, he invested $10 million in TomoTherapy a Madison, Wisconsin, biotechnology start-up.  It went public on May 9, 2007, with the stock symbol TOMO. Mr. Cudahy's 10% interest was valued at more than $100 million by September 2007.

He told the story of the founding of Marquette Electronics in the book Joyworks (2002).

Personal life and death

Cudahy was still actively working in the lead up to his 90th birthday in March 2014. 

Cudahy died on March 11, 2022, at the age of 97.

Philanthropy
The Michael J. Cudahy Foundation is the entity through which Cudahy did most of his philanthropy. It is completely distinct from the Patrick & Anna M. Cudahy Foundation, set up by his uncle, Michael F. Cudahy. The following institutions have been the recipients of gifts by Michael J. Cudahy:

 Boys and Girls Club
 John C. Cudahy YMCA 
 Discovery World
 University of Wisconsin–Milwaukee
 Johns Hopkins University – sponsors the Michael Cudahy professorship
 Marquette University
 Milwaukee Art Museum
 Milwaukee Ballet
 Milwaukee Public Museum
 Milwaukee School of Engineering
 Milwaukee Symphony Orchestra
 Pabst Theater – Cudahy bought the beleaguered landmark theatre in downtown Milwaukee for $1, keeping it open and afloat.  He had previously donated over $9 million to the theatre.    
 Riverside Theater – Cudahy signed a lease to run entertainment programs in the historic Riverside Theater in downtown Milwaukee.
 Pier Wisconsin – Cudahy was spearheading this ambitious project for Milwaukee's lakefront, which some argue would steal the limelight from the nearby Milwaukee Art Museum (also a recipient of Cudahy's funds).
 United Community Center
 American Heart Association – Supporter of the Milwaukee Heart Ball

References

1924 births
2022 deaths
20th-century American businesspeople
21st-century American businesspeople
American philanthropists
Businesspeople from Milwaukee
Cudahy family